Edward G. Pitka Sr. Airport  is a state-owned public-use airport located in Galena, a city in the Yukon-Koyukuk Census Area of the U.S. state of Alaska.

As per Federal Aviation Administration records, the airport had 7,784 passenger boardings (enplanements) in calendar year 2008, 7,447 enplanements in 2009, and 12,421 in 2010. It is included in the National Plan of Integrated Airport Systems for 2011–2015, which categorized it as a non-primary commercial service airport (between 2,500 and 10,000 enplanements per year) based on enplanements in 2008; however, it qualifies as a primary commercial service airport based on enplanements in 2010.

History

As Galena Airport, it was used as a military transport base during World War II, facilitating the transit of lend-lease aircraft to the Soviet Union.

As Galena Air Force Station, it was used by the USAF during the Cold War as an interceptor base for aircraft patrolling the western areas of Alaska. It was downsized in 1993, but the military airfield is maintained by a private contractor as a weather/emergency diversion airfield since Regular Air Force fighter-interceptor alert operations ended. It is now known as Galena Forward Operating Location.

Facilities and aircraft
Edward G. Pitka Sr Airport covers an area of 1,250 acres (506 ha) at an elevation of 153 feet (47 m) above mean sea level. It has two runways: 7/25 is 7,249 by 150 feet (2,209 x 46 m) with an asphalt and concrete surface; 6/24 is 2,786 by 80 feet (849 x 24 m) with a gravel ski strip surface.

The airport also sports a ski-jump takeoff ramp at one end and provisions for arresting gear (see picture, ski jump at 07 end) at the other, a leftover from the Cold War years as Galena Air Force Base, as tactical aircraft required more landing and takeoff space than was available on the runway.

For the 12-month period ending May 23, 2009, the airport had 19,000 aircraft operations, an average of 52 per day: 68% general aviation, 16% scheduled commercial, 11% military, and 5% air taxi. At that time there were 13 aircraft based at this airport: 77% single-engine, 8% multi-engine, and 15% ultralight.

Airlines and destinations

Passenger

Prior to its bankruptcy and cessation of all operations, Ravn Alaska served the airport from multiple locations.

Top destinations

See also
 Northwest Staging Route
 List of airports in Alaska
 Alaska World War II Army Airfields
 Air Transport Command

References

External links
 Topographic map from USGS The National Map
 AIR FORCES'S ALASKA PILOTS AWAIT CALL TO INTERCEPT SOVIET CRAFT GALENA AIR FORCE STATION, Alaska
 Galena Air Force Station
 FORMER GALENA FORWARD OPERATING LOCATION
 
 

Airports in the Yukon–Koyukuk Census Area, Alaska